Nicholas Kipkirui  (born 31 May 1996) is a striker with Kenyan Premier League side KCB.

Club career 
He formerly turned out for Kericho-based Zoo FC before moving to Gor Mahia in 2018 then to Nairobi City Starsin March 2021. 

While at Gor Mahia he won a treble of Kenyan Premier League titles in 2018, 2018-19 and 2019-20.

National teams 
He was capped for the Kenya national football team during an international friendly away to Mauritania in Aug 2017 after coming on as a late substitute at the Stade Adrar. 

In 2018 he made the provisional list for Kenya's Olympics squad, the Kenya U23.

References

External links
 
 

1996 births
Living people
Kenyan footballers
Gor Mahia F.C. players
Nairobi City Stars players
Kenyan Premier League players
Kenya international footballers